Cosmopterix ancistraea is a moth in the family Cosmopterigidae. It was described by Edward Meyrick in 1913. It is found in South Africa.

The forewings are bronzy blackish with a silvery-white subcostal line from the base, not nearly reaching the band, inclined downwards posteriorly. There is a silvery-white median line from the base almost to a projection of the band, as well as a white subdorsal line from one-fourth to the projection of the band. The dorsal edge is white from the base to one-third of the wing and the costal edge is shortly white before the band. There is a rather broad light ochreous-yellowish median band, somewhat narrowed dorsally, the anterior edge marked with two golden-metallic spots, the upper wholly anterior to the lower, followed by a black dot, the edge forming a projection between these, the posterior edge marked with two opposite golden-metallic spots, the lower preceded by a black speck, between these suffusedly projecting and giving rise to a white streak which soon becomes terminal and runs to the apex. The hindwings are light grey.

References

Endemic moths of South Africa
Moths described in 1913
ancistraea